Aaptos bergmanni is a species of sea sponge belonging to the family Suberitidae. The species was described in 1950 by de Laubenfels.

References

Aaptos
Animals described in 1950